Feed Me Bubbe was a low budget Jewish cooking show starring Bertha Jonas. "Bubbe" is the Yiddish word for "Grandmother." Jonas's grandson Avrom introduced each show from her kitchen in Worcester, Massachusetts declaring "Bubbe" one of the three words he needs to know when he is hungry and looking for Kosher food.

History
The series was produced by Chalutz Productions (Chalutz is Hebrew for "pioneer"). Feed Me Bubbe is part of the new trend in podcasting known as "Vodcast."

Being mentioned in British newspapers, as well as Avrom and Bubbe being guests or highlighted on many other podcasts, has led to Feed Me Bubbe quickly gaining a wide audience and becoming noted.

In each episode Bubbe introduces a recipe, teaches how to cook it, and shares stories from her past; also included is a feature entitled "Yiddish Word of the Day," in which Avrom learns a new Yiddish word from Bubbe. A more recently added segment—"Ask Bubbe"—features Bubbe answering viewer questions and feedback.

Jonas died on August 7, 2014. Her husband and videographer Bernard ("Zaide", Yiddish for grandfather) died May 18, 2015.

The first episode was released on Instant Media on June 16, 2006. Each episode is approximately 7 to 15 minutes long.

Feed Me Bubbe was one of the shows launched by Instant Media Network. Within its first month over 300 subscribers had made Feed Me Bubbe one of the network's most popular vodcasts. In the first annual Vloggie Awards Feed Me Bubbe was nominated in the cooking category.

Characters
Bubbe Avrom's grandmother, co-host, and chef
Avrom producer and co-host of Feed Me Bubbe
Zaide Bubbe's husband, videographer

While the character of "Bubbe" is a stage name meaning "Grandmother," Bubbe was Honig's real-life grandmother and her real name was not used in the show. She often used the alias "Bayla Sher" (her Yiddish first name with her maiden last name) for media appearances, to further protect her identity.

References

External links
 
"Jeff's Guide to "TV Shows Only Available on the Internet"
"Network2 reviews the podcast"
"Scan of article 7/28/2006—The Jewish Chronicle, UK Arts & Books: The people of the podcast By Judy Silkoff"
"Podcast Salad 29: Epicurious Bob Chicken Bubbe Kitchen"
"Episode 24 of Upon Further Review! November 27, 2006"
"Item #67 How To Prepare Gefilte Fish With A Traditional Taste, One Minute How To"
Cached page from Google of nominations from the Vloggies 2006

2006 web series debuts
Ashkenazi Jewish culture in Massachusetts
Video podcasts
Yiddish culture in the United States
Cooking web series
Ashkenazi Jewish cuisine
American non-fiction web series
Jewish podcasts